HD 131425 (HR 5547) is a solitary star in the southern circumpolar constellation Apus. It has an apparent magnitude of 5.92, allowing it to be seen with the naked eye under ideal conditions.

HD 131425 has a stellar classification of G8 II, indicating that it is an ageing G-type bright giant.

References

Apus (constellation)
G-type bright giants
Apodis, 19
Durchmusterung objects
131425
5547
73415